Euphorini is a tribe of braconid wasps in the subfamily Euphorinae.

References 

 Shaw, S.R. 1987: Orionis, a new genus from Central America, with an analysis of its phylogenetic placement in the tribe Euphorini (Hymenoptera: Braconidae). Systematic entomology, 12: 103–109. 
 Shaw, S.R. 1996: Plynops, a peculiar new genus and ten new species in the tribe Euphorini (Hymenoptera: Braconidae: Euphorinae). Journal of Hymenoptera research, 5: 166–183.

External links 
 

 Euphorini at insectoid.info

Euphorinae
Parasitica tribes